The following is a timeline of the history of Belgrade, the capital of Serbia.

Timeline

Early years

Early AD

9th — 16th centuries

16th — 19th centuries

Early 20th century

Late 20th century

Modern era

See also 
 History of Belgrade
 Siege of Belgrade (disambiguation)

References

External links
 Important years in city history at the official website of the City of Belgrade.

Belgrade
History of Belgrade
Belgrade
Belgrade